This is a list of Romanian football transfers for the 2009–10 transfer windows. Only moves featuring at least one Liga I club are listed.

Transfers

Notes and references

Romania
Transfers
2009-10